Banet is a surname. Notable people with the surname include:

 Herb Banet (1913–2003), American football player
 Vicente Banet, Cuban tennis player
 Vincent Banet, French rugby league player
 Sarah Banet-Weiser (born 1966), American academic and author

See also
 Binet